Åland is a part of Finland and is governed by the Constitution of Finland. The Constitution does mention Åland (§ 25, 58, 75, 120) but immediately refers to the Autonomy Act of Åland. This is an ordinary act. However, its provisions affect constitutional rights.

The Autonomy Act of Åland defines the following: 
 The Finnish government is represented by the Provincial Governor. 
 "Home region right" (Swedish: hembygdsrätt), which includes the right to participate in elections, own property, or operate a business on the islands, and the exemption from Finnish conscription, is defined. The conditions defined are five years of residency, fluency in Swedish, and existing Finnish citizenship.
 The provincial parliament and provincial government, and their authority.
 A list is provided on which issues the provincial parliament can legislate.
 A procedure is defined where the Finnish Ministry of Justice reviews the provincial acts and submits them to the president. If disputed, the Supreme Court is consulted, and the President is authorized to strike down the provincial act, completely or partially, should it exceed the provincial parliament's authority or concern national security.
 It is defined that the provincial government administrates the issues that the provincial parliament can legislate. (§ 23)
 The province's administrative court is defined as a court of first instance regarding issues within the provincial parliament's legislative power, and the Supreme Administrative Court of Finland is defined as the appeals court.
 Authority of the Finnish central government (5 L).
 Language issues (6 L)
 The official language is defined as Swedish, in contrast to the mainland, where both Finnish and Swedish are defined as official languages of the state. 
 Finnish citizens have the right to speak Finnish in matters directly concerning them.
 Åland residents are exempt from Finnish language tests in mainland schools.
 Finances of the province (7 L)
 Provincial Governor (8 L)
 International treaties (9 L) - the provincial parliament can choose not to ratify them; for example, Åland chose not to enter the EU VAT zone.
 Miscellaneous provisions (10 L)

References 

Åland law
Åland
Government of Finland